Bryan Orritt (22 February 1937 – 24 March 2014) was a Welsh professional footballer who played as an inside forward or wing half. He made more than 200 appearances in the Football League, and was capped three times for Wales at under-23 level.

Born in Caernarfon, Orritt began his football career with local club Llanfair PG before joining Bangor City. In 1956 he joined English First Division club Birmingham City, for whom he went on to play in the finals of the 1960 and 1961 Inter-Cities Fairs Cups, becoming one of the first Welsh footballers to take part in European competition.

In 1962 he moved to Middlesbrough, and became the first substitute ever used by the club.

He emigrated to South Africa, playing for and later managing Southern Suburbs F.C.,

Orritt died in a Johannesburg nursing home on 24 March 2014 at the age of 77.

References
General

Specific

External links
 Profile at The Citizens Choice, a Bangor City unofficial site

1937 births
2014 deaths
People from Caernarfon
Sportspeople from Gwynedd
Welsh footballers
Wales under-23 international footballers
Association football midfielders
Association football forwards
Bangor City F.C. players
Birmingham City F.C. players
Middlesbrough F.C. players
Rangers F.C. (South Africa) players
Berea Park F.C. players
English Football League players
British emigrants to South Africa
National Football League (South Africa) players